Urvin Lee (born 18 August 1973 in Amsterdam, Netherlands), sometimes written as Ervin Lee, is a Dutch footballer who played for several clubs in the Dutch Eerste Divisie and Eredivisie leagues.  Lee made his Eerste Divisie debut with HFC Haarlem during the 1991–1992 season and made his debut for the Eredivisie league for club Fortuna Sittard during the 1995–1996 season.
He also played for AZ Alkmaar.

References

External links
 
 ESPN FC profile

Dutch footballers
Footballers from Amsterdam
HFC Haarlem players
Fortuna Sittard players
SC Telstar players
AZ Alkmaar players
Eredivisie players
Eerste Divisie players
1973 births
Living people
Association football defenders
VV DOVO players